Roman Bragin (born ) is a Russian male volleyball player. With his club Belogorie Belgorod he competed at the 2014 FIVB Volleyball Men's Club World Championship. As part of the Russia men's national volleyball team he won the bronze medal at the 2015 European Games in Baku.

References

External links
 profile at FIVB.org

1987 births
Living people
Russian men's volleyball players
Place of birth missing (living people)
Volleyball players at the 2015 European Games
European Games bronze medalists for Russia
European Games medalists in volleyball
20th-century Russian people
21st-century Russian people